

285001–285100 

|-bgcolor=#f2f2f2
| colspan=4 align=center | 
|}

285101–285200 

|-bgcolor=#f2f2f2
| colspan=4 align=center | 
|}

285201–285300 

|-bgcolor=#f2f2f2
| colspan=4 align=center | 
|}

285301–285400 

|-bgcolor=#f2f2f2
| colspan=4 align=center | 
|}

285401–285500 

|-bgcolor=#f2f2f2
| colspan=4 align=center | 
|}

285501–285600 

|-bgcolor=#f2f2f2
| colspan=4 align=center | 
|}

285601–285700 

|-bgcolor=#f2f2f2
| colspan=4 align=center | 
|}

285701–285800 

|-bgcolor=#f2f2f2
| colspan=4 align=center | 
|}

285801–285900 

|-bgcolor=#f2f2f2
| colspan=4 align=center | 
|}

285901–286000 

|-id=937
| 285937 Anthonytaylor ||  || Anthony Hollis Taylor (1942–2019), an American fighter pilot, engineer, author, and interplanetary spacecraft navigator for the Jet Propulsion Laboratory who led the orbit determination team for the New Horizons mission and played a major role in the successful flyby of the Pluto system in 2015 (Src). || 
|}

References 

285001-286000